Florentina Stanciu (born 28 July 1982) is a Romanian-born Icelandic handballer who plays for SCM Craiova. 

She was given the award of Cetățean de onoare ("Honorary Citizen") of the city of Craiova in 2018.

International honours
EHF Cup: 
Winner: 2018
 
EHF Cup Winners' Cup: 
Semifinalist: 2004

European Youth Championship: 
Gold Medalist: 1999

Individual awards 
 All-Star Team Best Goalkeeper of the European Youth Championship: 1999
 All-Star Team Best Goalkeeper of the European Junior Championship: 2000
 All-Star Team Best Goalkeeper of the World Junior Championship: 2001 
 Best Goalkeeper of the Icelandic Premier League: 2014

References
 

1982 births
Living people
Sportspeople from Craiova
Romanian female handball players
Icelandic female handball players 
Romanian expatriates in France
Romanian expatriates in Iceland 
Expatriate handball players
Naturalised citizens of Iceland
Icelandic people of Romanian descent
Stjarnan women's handball players